Westmanbukta is a bay at the northern side of Storsteinhalvøya in Gustav V Land at Nordaustlandet, Svalbard. The bay is named after Swedish meteorologist Jonas Westman.

References

Bays of Svalbard
Nordaustlandet